The 1994 Toronto municipal election was held in November 1994 to elect councillors in Metropolitan Toronto, Ontario, Canada, and mayors, councillors and school trustees in Toronto, York, East York, North York, Scarborough and Etobicoke.

The election was noted as a defeat for incumbents. Three sitting mayors were defeated: June Rowlands in Toronto, Fergy Brown, in York, and Bruce Sinclair of Etobicoke. On Metro Toronto Council it was a victory for the left as the New Democratic Party (NDP) faction grew from six to nine members.

Metro Council

Ten of Metro Council's 28 members ran unopposed in the election, and they were therefore acclaimed. No incumbents were defeated. The most noted change was the growth of the left wing NDP faction from six to nine. New NDP members were David Miller, Caroline Di Giovanni, and mayor Michael Prue.

 High Park
David Miller – 7,950
Andrew Witer – 6,845
Tony Clement – 4,722
Carl Manning – 1,390

Trinity Niagara
Joe Pantalone (incumbent) – acclaimed

Downtown
Olivia Chow (incumbent) – 13,327
Jeffrey Valentine – 5,940

Don River
Jack Layton – 10,117
Paul Raina – 3,927
Nola Crew – 3,898
John Stavropoulos – 2,080
Amber Martin – 546

East Toronto
Paul Christie (incumbent) – 15,437
Karen Buck – 4,156
James Alcock – 1,118

Davenport
Dennis Fotinos (incumbent) – acclaimed

Midtown
Ila Bossons (incumbent) – 10,945
Paul Moscoe – 6,650
Yen Shih – 2,171

North Toronto
Anne Johnston (incumbent) – acclaimed

East York
Case Ootes – 12,511
John Papadakis – 8,631
Steve Hajagos – 1,785

Lakeshore Queensway
Blake Kinahan (incumbent) – 8,699
Jeff Knoll – 8,151

Markland Centennial
Dick O'Brien (incumbent) – acclaimed

Kingsway Humber
Dennis Flynn (incumbent) – acclaimed

Rexdale Thistletown
Lois Griffin (incumbent) – 6,829
John Kiru – 4,738
Patrick T. McCool – 1,575

North York Humber
Judy Sgro – acclaimed

Black Creek
Maria Augimeri (incumbent) – 12,925
Camilo Tiqui – 1,784

North York Spadina
Howard Moscoe (incumbent) – acclaimed

North York Centre South
Bev Salmon (incumbent) – acclaimed

North York Centre
Norman Gardner (incumbent) – acclaimed

Don Parkway
Gordon Chong – 6,870
Darlene Scott – 4,912
Simon Lagopoulos – 3,927
Paul Azzarello – 996
Ed Ball – 736

Seneca Heights
Joan King (incumbent) – 11,290
Mary Fioro – 3,471
Bernadette Michael – 1,310

Scarborough Bluffs
Brian Ashton (incumbent) – 13,191
Randall Bentley – 4,953

Scarborough Wexford
Norm Kelly – 8,486
Michael Thompson – 4,003
Ralph Potter

Scarborough City Centre
Brian Harrison (incumbent) – 13,705
Worrick Russell – 4,966

Scarborough Highland Creek
Ken Morrish (incumbent) – 12,617
John Kruger – 7,116

Scarborough Agincourt
Scott Cavalier (incumbent) – 7,500
Anne McBride – 3,601
Colin Turnpenney – 1,808

Scarborough Malvern
Raymond Cho (incumbent) – 10,272
Diamond Tobin-West – 3,382
Yaqoob Khan – 1,807

York Eglinton
Caroline Di Giovanni – acclaimed

York Humber
Alan Tonks (incumbent) – 13,771
Stuart Weinstein – 4,395

Toronto

Toronto mayor
In the City of Toronto, the most high-profile race was that for Mayor of Toronto in which incumbent June Rowlands was challenged by city councillor Barbara Hall, the first time a race for mayor had two female front-runners. Though the candidates were nominally independent, Rowlands was backed by the right-wing consisting of a coalition of right-wing Liberals and Progressive Conservatives (Rowlands was a member of the Liberal Party) while Hall was backed by New Democrats, left-wing Liberals, and Red Tories. Hall had been a member of the City NDP caucus on city council and had been an NDP candidate in the 1987 provincial election.

As a consequence of Jack Layton's failure to win the mayoralty as an official NDP candidate in the 1991 election, Hall preferred to run without a party label and included prominent Liberals such as George Smitherman on her campaign team.

Rowlands' tenure as mayor had resulted in criticism by many of her supporters, particularly those on the right. Her decision to ban the Barenaked Ladies, a rock band, from performing at Nathan Phillips Square because their name might be considered sexist was seen as both pandering to political correctness and evidence that she was out of touch with contemporary culture. Her allegedly slow response to a riot on Yonge Street following the acquittal of the police who beat Rodney King also made her appear out of touch.

Rowlands's campaign was hurt by the candidacy of Gerry Meinzer, a businessman and political novice who, though he never had the support or organization needed to win, succeeded in taking enough votes from the Rowlands' centre-right coalition to ensure her defeat.

Toronto city council

Ward 1 (Swansea and Bloor West Village)
David Hutcheon – 3,963
Al Chumak – 3,182
Nick Trainos – 2,251
Bill Roberts – 1,725
Myron Tymochko – 1,126
Greg Roberts – 168

Ward 2 (Parkdale
Chris Korwin-Kuczynski (incumbent) – 6,738
Steve Magwood – 1,624
Janet Fisher – 1,179

Ward 3 (Brockton)
Mario Silva – 2,976
Tony O'Donohue (incumbent) – 2,961
Fernando Dias Costa – 344
Bob Allisat – 247

Ward 4 (Trinity-Bellwoods and Little Italy)
Martin Silva (incumbent) – 3,881
Nick Figliano – 2,627
Hank Young – 500

Ward 5 (Financial District, Toronto – University of Toronto)
Dan Leckie – 4,342
Benson Lau – 3,546
Spiro Karagianis – 629

Ward 6 Downtown East
Kyle Rae (incumbent) – 6,601
Simon de Groot – 4,718

Ward 7 (Regent Park and Cabbagetown)
Pam McConnell – 2,678
Thomas Vegh – 2,528
Mike Armstrong – 1,186
Sarah Hood – 1,033
Brenda Kildey – 185

Ward 8 (Riverdale)
Peter Tabuns (incumbent) – 6,134
Arthur Potts – 4,319
Dan Salapoutis – 1,991
Michael Green – 716

Ward 9 (East Danforth)
Steve Ellis (incumbent) – 5,176
Michael Yorke – 2,673
Terry Brackett – 2,258

Ward 10 (The Beaches)
Tom Jakobek (incumbent) – 9,473
Will Molson – 1,952
Joe Cirone – 407
James Brookman – 259

Ward 11 (The Junction)
Rob Maxwell (incumbent) – 3,015
Antonino Lopes – 2,607
Dale Ritch – 970
John Gairy – 371
Sal David Romano – 244

Ward 12 (Davenport and Corso Italia)
Betty Disero (incumbent) – 6,360
Fred Dominelli – 2,937

Ward 13 (The Annex and Yorkville)
John Adams (incumbent) – 6,841
Paul Boreham – 2,422

Ward 14 (Forest Hill)
Howard Joy – 4,266
Howard Levine (incumbent) – 3,273
Stanley Taube – 2,589
Mona Kornberg – 871
Ron Robins – 200

Ward 15 (Western North Toronto)Kay Gardner (incumbent) – 9,360
Sylvia Smith – 3,018

Ward 16 (Davisville and Lawrence Park)Michael Walker (incumbent) – 8,543
Leslie Yager – 4,454

East York
All incumbents running were easily re-elected. Mayor Prue was challenged by former councillor Bob Willis who felt that Prue hadn't done a good job but he came up well short. Case Ootes in Ward 1 ran for a seat on Metro Council allowing Michael Tziretas to win his seat. Paul Robinson, John Antonopolous, and Tim Cholvat were also newcomers.

† denotes incumbent from previous council

Mayor
 †Michael Prue, 15,620
 Bob Willis, 6,295
 Anne Sinclair, 1,403
 Kevin Clarke, 788
 June French, 648

Council
Two councillors elected in each ward.

Ward 1
 †Norm Crone, 3,036
 Michael Tziretas, 2,298
 Chris Perivolaris, 1,429
 Paul Taylor, 1,686
 Alex Parucha, 490
 
Ward 2
 †George Vasilopoulos, 3,614
 Paul Robinson, 2,749
 Jackie Aherne, 1,340
 Stena Kavanaugh, 735
 Helen Riley, 707
 Helen Andreou, 694
 Gerard Van Deelen, 525
 Andrew D. Lauder, 326
 William Richards, 274
 William D. Taylor, 272
 
Ward 3
 †Bob Dale, 2,570
 John Antonopoulos, 2,298
 Michael Wyatt, 1,776
 Tom Mangos, 1,016
 Frances Green, 565
 
Ward 4
 †Lorna Krawchuk, 4,250
 Tim Cholvat, 2,478
 Bernard Tanz, 2,411
 John Parker, 2,289
 Ian Cameron, 2,185

Etobicoke

Mayor
Douglas Holyday 31,045
x-Bruce Sinclair 29,687
Norm Matusiak 10,508
Tom Hollinshead 1,910
Herman Jardine 1,146

Council
Ward 1
Irene Jones 2,383
Bob Gullins 1,947
Dave Sandford 1,306
 
Ward 2
Peter Milczyn 1,986
Dietmar Lein 1,491
Peter Ramos 670
Richard Ciupa 668
Donald Fraser 317
Bill Denning 288
Bob Currie 266
Jamil Ahmed 216
Jeffrey Weeks 189
 
Ward 3
Connie Micallef 2,073
Donald C. Kerr 1,582
Mark Elkin 1,541
Larry Faseruk 896
George Barroilhet 278
 
Ward 4
Michael O'Rourke 5,883 
Stephen Boujikian 1,043 
 
Ward 5
Brian Flynn 3,535
Anne Methot 2,531
Bob Hogarth 396
Jarret Florecki 327
John Formanek 234
 
Ward 6
Agnes Ugolini Potts 3,142
Ann Andrachuk 2,274
Jerry Taciuk 611
Paul Kipin 351
 
Ward 7
Gloria Luby 5,460
Martin Fraser 1,311
 
Ward 8
Mario Giansante 2,363
Avie Flaherty 1,961
Ray Morand 1,069
George Suhanic 834
Ken Lopez 466
Phillip Lazzarino 361
John Sumka 341
Ross Norris 336
Ron Pines 292
Darlene Gres 135
 
Ward 9
Alex Marchetti 2,916
Peter Kell 1,790
Edward M. Chop 569
Gaetano Savaglio 292
 
Ward 10
Brian Ineson 3,148
Allan Millard 2,607
 
Ward 11
Elizabeth Brown 1,906
Frank Quinn 1,453
Brian Khan 1,065
 
Ward 12
John Hastings 1,691
Vincent Crisanti 1,055
Adu K. Boakye 303
Anil Banerjee 275

North York
Mel Lastman was re-elected mayor of the City. All incumbent councillors were re-elected except Judy Sgro who opted to run for Metro Council instead. Gina Severino replaced her as councillor for Ward 2.

Mayor
 Mel Lastman 96,279
 Julia McCrea 7,405
 Lennox Farrell 7,060

Council
Ward 1
 Mario Sergio 6,201
 Steve Pitt 2,481

Ward 2
 Gina Severino 3,944
 Jim Dervill 1,709
 Jim Susini 1,315
 Fluvio Sansoni 1,250

Ward 3
 Peter Li Preti 4,662
 Marcelo Ramirez 655
 Giacomo del Prete 596
 Robert Ragazzon 315

Ward 4
 Frank Di Giorgio acclaimed

Ward 5
 Mario Rizzo 5,908
 Linda Mommo 2,978
 Victoria Colby 741

Ward 6
 Milton Berger 4,506
 Dean Corrigan 1,673
 Albert Pantaleo 1,518

Ward 7
 Michael Feldman 7,437
 Michael Klein 1,451

Ward 8
 Joanne Flint acclaimed

Ward 9
 Ron Summers acclaimed

Ward 10
 Don Yuill 5,039
 Jim Carr 1,965
 Ralph Myers 1,884

Ward 11
 John Filion acclaimed

Ward 12
 Denzil Minnan-Wong 4,222
 Laurence Ritchie 3,267
 Mario Ribeiro 487
 Peter Nastamagou 396

Ward 13
 David Shiner acclaimed

Ward 14
 Paul Sutherland 7,039
 Rajendru Persaud 1,107North York Board of Education (School Trustees)'''

Ward 8 Gerri Gershon

Ward 9 Shelley Stillman

Scarborough

Mayor
Faubert, Frank 54,885
Mushinski, Marilyn 24,041
Prinsloo, Maureen  17,376
O'Malley, John 	    5,088
French, Max 	    2,792
Van Wyk, Abel 	    2,758

Councillors
Ward 1
Barron, Harvey 	  4,915
Droege, Wolfgang    802
 
Ward 2
Altobello, Gerry  Acclamation
 
Ward 3
Tzekas, Mike 	  4,276
Wardrope, John 	  2,547
Page, George 	  1,297
 
Ward 4
Berardinetti, Lorenzo 	5,551
Legault Sr, Georges 	1,193
 
Ward 5
Duguid, Brad 	2,982
Settatree, Bill 1,490
Crawford, Paul 	1,060
Fermanis, Chris   627
Walsh, Greg 	  517
Faria, Ana Maria  300
 
Ward 6
Mushinski, Paul 4,218
Hughes, Brian 	1,700
Buhagair, Chris 1,053
 
Ward 7
Johnson, Fred 	6,545
Green, Ed 	1,675
 
Ward 8
Soknacki, David 	4,025
De Baeremaeker, Glenn 	3,229
Wailoo, Zephine 	382
 
Ward 9
Moeser, Ron 	7,576
Lamanna, Tony 	3,619
Calandra, Paul 	1,471
 
Ward 10
Watson, Ron 	        4,809
Persaud, Chandra 	1,723
 
Ward 11
Shaw, Sherene 	3,197
Lombardi, Don 	2,272
Lee, Chin 	1,944
 
Ward 12
Mahood, Doug 	4,881
Chan, Rosa 	1,798
Ngan, Peter 	692
 
Ward 13
Balkissoon, Bas 	5,300
Thomas, Michael 	953
Sapsford, Bruce 	774
Francois, Sonny 	426

Ward 14
Montgomery, Edith 	5,663
Dekort, Joe 	        2,302

York

Mayor
Frances Nunziata  20611   56.7%
Fergy Brown       14195   39.1%
Nancy Loewen           1519    4.2%

Council
Ward 1 –
Roz Mendelson  57.5%

Ward 2 –
Joe Mihevc  35.4%

Ward 3 – 
Rob Davis  45.2%

Ward 4 – 
Joan Roberts  40.3%

Ward 5 – 
Barry Rowland  44.4%

Ward 6 – 
Michael McDonald   74.5%

Ward 7 – 
Randy Leach  30.9%

Ward 8 – 
Bill Saundercook    2996  61.1%
Margo Duncan        1905  38.9%

Metro Councillor Ward 21 –
Caroline Di Giovanni (Acclamation)

Metro Councillor Ward 22
Alan Tonks    13759  76.2%
Stuart Weinstein   4298  23.8%

School Board Ward 1
Ed Blackstock

School Board Ward 2
Pete Karageorgos

School Board Ward 3
Sam Wales

School Board Ward 4
Elizabeth Hill

School Board Ward 5
Joe Morriello

School Board Ward 6
Bonnie Taylor

School Board Ward 7
Bob Thomson

School Board Ward 8
Carl Miller

References

1994
1994 Ontario municipal elections
1994 in Toronto